Visitors to Argentina must obtain a visa from one of the Argentinian diplomatic missions unless they come from one of the visa exempt countries.

Visa policy map

Visa exemption
Holders of ordinary passports of the following jurisdictions can visit Argentina without a visa for up to 90 days (unless otherwise noted):

ID - May also enter with an ID card if arriving from a Mercosur country.
1 - Not applicable to holders of British subject or British Protected Person passports.
2 - For a stay of up to 30 days.

Travelers of any nationality do not require a visa for transit up to 12 hours, while remaining in the airport or station.

Diplomatic and service category passports 

Holders of diplomatic or service category passports of countries whose ordinary passport holders are exempt from visas (listed above) also do not require a visa, except for Australia, Canada, Ireland, United States and Venezuela. The visa waiver for diplomatic and service passports of Venezuela was suspended for an indefinite period from 10 January 2019.

In addition, holders of diplomatic or service category passports of Albania, Algeria, Angola, Antigua and Barbuda, Azerbaijan, Belize, Botswana, China, Cuba, Dominican Republic, Egypt, Haiti, India, Indonesia, Mongolia, Morocco, Mozambique, Pakistan, Philippines, Tunisia and Vietnam do not require a visa.

Electronic Travel Authorization
Nationals of most countries and territories that are not visa exempt may apply for an Electronic Travel Authorization (or AVE) when travelling for tourism purposes.

Regarding foreigners originating from jurisdictions that are exempt from visas for entry to the USA, holders of valid and current ordinary, diplomatic, official or service passports, may process their AVE provided they demonstrate and are verifiable at least 1 entry to the aforementioned country, in the 2 years prior to the application or who have a valid permit issued by the Electronic System for Travel Authorization (ESTA) or B2 visas /J/B1/O/P (P1-P2-P3)/E/H-1B issued by the USA.

When approved, they are issued a printed confirmation of their eTA which they use to travel for 90 days without having to obtain a traditional visa.

This is not applicable to nationals of the following countries and territories:

As of November 2019, citizens of countries that do not require a visa for Schengen Area or the United States but who require a visa for Argentina may also apply for AVE if they had travelled to one of those two zones at least once in the past two years or if they hold and electronic authorization to travel issued by their authorities.

Travel Certificate required
Holders of passports of the following jurisdictions must use a Travel Certificate issued by Argentina instead of a visa when travelling:

See also

Visa requirements for Argentine citizens

References

External links
Dirección Nacional de Migraciones of Argentina
Argentina visa requirements by nationality (Spanish), Dirección Nacional de Migraciones de la Argentina

Argentina
Foreign relations of Argentina